This page summarizes 2018 in Estonian football.

National teams 

The home team or the team that is designated as the home team is listed in the left column; the away team is in the right column.

Senior 

Friendly matches 

2018–19 UEFA Nations League

2018 Baltic Cup

Youth 
U23

U21

U19

U17

County competition
Estonian Football Association together with the provincial sport associations and local promoters arrange the Estonian County Competition, where 15 counties and the capital Tallinn have their football teams face each other. All teams will play each other twice (home and away). If a game is drawn, a winner will be founded with penalties, but a draw is put into the protocol and both teams get one point added to the table. Every year every team plays one game. The competition was started in 2012.

Results

Men's football

Promotion and relegation 

1. Club did not enter the Championship

Meistriliiga

Esiliiga

Esiliiga B

II liiga

III liiga

IV liiga

Post-season games

League winners 

II liiga

Home teams listed on top of bracket. (AET): At Extra Time

III liiga

Home teams listed on top of bracket. (AET): At Extra Time

IV liiga

Home teams listed on top of bracket. (AET): At Extra Time

Promotion & Relegation play-offs 

To Meistriliiga

To Esiliiga

9th placed Keila JK got to play in the play-offs, because 7th placed Tartu FC Santos announced that they are going to play in II liiga the following year and so 8th placed JK Tallinna Kalev U21 remains in Esiliiga and Keila JK has the chance to compete in the play-offs.

To Esiliiga B

|-

9th placed Lasnamäe FC Ajax got to play in the play-offs, because Esiliigas 7th placed Tartu FC Santos announced that they are going to play in II liiga the following year and so 8th placed Paide Linnameeskond U21 remains in Esiliiga B and Lasnamäe FC Ajax has the chance to compete in the play-offs.

To II liiga

|-

|-

To III liiga

Women's football

Naiste Meistriliiga

Naiste Esiliiga

Naiste Teine liiga

Post-season games 

To Meistriliiga

To Esiliiga

Cup competitions

Estonian Cup 

Home teams listed on top of bracket. (AET): At Extra Time

Estonian Small Cup 

Home teams listed on top of bracket. (AET): At Extra Time

Estonian Women's Cup 

Home teams listed on top of bracket. (AET): At Extra Time
Number at the back of the club indicates the league in which the club played in 2018

International competitions

Tallinna FC Flora

Nõmme Kalju FC

Tallinna FCI Levadia

JK Narva Trans

Pärnu JK

Notes

References 

 
Seasons in Estonian football